Thomas Henry Goldberger served as Chargé d'Affaires at the U.S. Embassy in Cairo, Egypt in 2014 and from 2017-2019.

With a focus on the Middle East, Goldberger has served as Assistant Chief of Mission at the U.S. Embassy in Baghdad, Deputy Chief of Mission in Tel Aviv and director of the Office of Israel and Palestinian Affairs at the U.S. Department of State “where he was responsible for coordinating U.S. support for peace negotiations between Israel and its neighbors.”

In early 2019, Goldberger closed the US Embassy booth at the Cairo International Book Fair (“considered the most important event in the Arabic publishing world“) when the Simon Wiesenthal Center reported about anti-Semitic materials.

Early life
Goldberger is a native of New Jersey and graduated from Rutgers University and Georgetown University.

References

Living people
Year of birth missing (living people)
People from New Jersey
21st-century American diplomats
Rutgers University alumni
Georgetown University alumni
United States Foreign Service personnel